The Golden Wind Zen Order (GWZO) is an American Zen Buddhist Order with centers and groups in Long Beach, CA and Seattle, WA. It was founded in 2004 by Zen Master Ji Bong  (Robert Moore). Moore began training with the Korean Zen Master Seung Sahn in 1974, and was one of the founders of the New Haven Zen Center and core teachers of the early years of the international Kwan Um School of Zen. He was a teacher at several centers around the United States, and after more than twenty years of training, he received Dharma transmission from Seung Sahn in 1997.

Moore established his own practice center in the 1990s, and eventually broke off from the Kwan Um School in 2004 to establish an independent organization, the Golden Wind Zen Order. Though not affiliated with the Kwan Um School, the GWZO follows many of its practice forms, with an emphasis on seated meditation practice, kong-an training, and chanting.

The Order's practice centers are the Golden Wind Zen Center (currently in the Signal Hill area of Long Beach, CA) and the Blue Heron Zen Community in Seattle, WA.

History
The Korean Zen Master Seung Sahn, Robert Moore, and Paul Lynch founded the Huntington Beach Zen Center in 1993. The first center was a four bedroom house, with the Dharma Room located in the back of the house. In early 1994 the Zen Center accepted its first resident, who lived as a novice monk full-time at the Zen Center. A few residents moved in and out of the Huntington Beach Zen Center, including a Korean monk. In 1995 the Zen Center was moved to a larger six bedroom house in Stanton. At that time Zen Master Seung Sahn suggested changing the name of the center to Ocean Eyes Zen Center.

In 1997 the Ocean Eyes Zen Center moved from Stanton to a residence in Long Beach, California where it was established as a residential center with 5 to 6 full-time resident students. However, the residential model came into conflict with local zoning ordinances, and in 1999 the Center became temporarily homeless. However, students continued to practice in transitional locations in Whittier and in San Pedro until 2000, when the Center reopened at a new location in Long Beach. In 2011, the Center re-located to a commercial building in the Signal Hill area of Long Beach.

These centers were all affiliated with the international Kwan Um School of Zen until 2004. That year Moore and the membership decided to change the name of the Center to the Golden Wind Zen Center, and to affiliate with a new, independent teaching organization called the Golden Wind Zen Order.

The Dharma Sound Zen Community in Seattle, WA was originally established under the auspices of the Kwan Um School of Zen, with Moore as their guiding teacher. After Moore established the GWZO, Dharma Sound members elected to retain Moore as their guiding teacher, and to affiliate with the GWZO. In 2006, Dharma Sound changed its name to the Blue Heron Zen Community, and also separated from the Kwan Um School.

Over some two decades, Moore trained several students to become teachers or "Ji Do Poep Sunims" (JDPSN, or "Dharma Masters"). These have included Jeff Tipp, Eric Nord, and Anita Feng in Seattle, along with Tim Colohan and Sensei Frank McGouirk in Long Beach. McGouirk has been the head teacher and director of the Aikido-Ai dojo in Whittier, CA for several years, and some GWZO members also practice and teach there. After nearly twenty years of training, Colohan left the GWZO in 2015 to pursue other teaching and practice opportunities.

In 2015, Zen Master Ji Bong (Robert Moore) gave transmission to his first Dharma heir, Zen Master Jeong Ji (Anita Feng) at the Blue Heron Zen Community in Seattle, WA.

Teaching Hierarchy

Guiding Teachers
Ji Bong Zen Master Robert Moore
Jeong Ji Zen Master Anita Feng
 Jeff Tipp, Ji Do Poep Sa Nim or "Dharma Master" (JDPSN)
 Eric Nord, JDPSN
 Ann Pepper, JDPSN
 Sensei Frank McGouirk (not currently active)
 Tim Colohan (not currently active)

See also

Buddhism in the United States
Timeline of Zen Buddhism in the United States

Notes

References

External links
Golden Wind Zen Center
Aikido Ai Dojo
Blue Heron Zen Community

2004 establishments in California
Buddhism in California
Buddhist orders
Schools of Buddhism founded in the United States
Zen in the United States